Jordan Lucella Elizabeth Chiles (born April 15, 2001)  is an American artistic gymnast. She represented the United States at the 2020 Summer Olympics and won a silver medal in the team event. She was a member of the team that won gold at the 2022 World Championships. Individually, she is the 2022 World vault silver medalist and floor silver medalist. She has been a member of the United States women's national gymnastics team since 2013.

Early and personal life
Chiles was born in Tualatin, Oregon, on April 15, 2001, to Timothy and Gina Chiles. She was named after American basketball player Michael Jordan. She is one of five children, her siblings being Jazmin, Jade, Tajmen, and Tyrus. She grew up in Vancouver, Washington, but moved to Spring, Texas in 2019 to train alongside American gymnast and Olympic medalist Simone Biles at the World Champions Centre.

Gymnastics career

Junior career

2013–14
Chiles made her elite debut at the 2013 American Classic where she won the bronze medal in the all-around behind Ariana Agrapides and Laurie Hernandez and the silver medal on vault behind Felicia Hano. At the 2013 P&G National Championships, Chiles finished eleventh in the all-around with a total score of 108.050, and she also finished sixth on vault. She was selected to be a member of the Junior National Team.

Chiles made her international debut at the 2014 City of Jesolo Trophy. She won a gold medal with the team and finished sixth in the all-around. In the event finals, Chiles placed second on vault behind her teammate Bailie Key. At the 2014 Secret U.S. Classic, Chiles won the all-around competition with a score of 57.350. She then competed at the 2014 U.S. National Championships where she finished fourth in the all-around. She won the bronze medals on both the vault and the floor exercise. She was once again named to the Junior National Team.

2015–16
After a tough competition, Chiles placed eighth in the all-around at the 2015 U.S. Classic. She tied with Jazmyn Foberg for the bronze medal on the uneven bars. She finished fourth in the all-around and won the gold medal on the vault at the 2015 U.S. National Championships and was once again selected for the junior national team.

Chiles competed at the 2016 International Gymnix in Montreal alongside Emma Malabuyo, Gabby Perea, and Deanne Soza, and they won the gold medal in the junior team competition. Chiles then won the gold medal in the vault event final. She then won the junior all-around title at the 2016 City of Jesolo Trophy. In the event finals, she won the gold medal on vault, tied with Emma Malabuyo for the silver medal on the uneven bars, finished fifth on the balance beam, and eighth on the floor exercise. At the 2016 U.S. Classic, she finished fourth in the all-around and won the gold medal on vault.

Senior career

2017
Chiles made her senior debut at the American Classic where she only competed on the uneven bars and the balance beam and finished fourth and fifth, respectively. At the U.S. Classic, she finished fifth in the all-around. In August, Chiles competed at the U.S. National Championships where she placed second in the all-around behind Ragan Smith, in addition to a fourth-place finish on the balance beam. During her balance beam performance she flubbed a wolf turn but saved it by connecting it to an unplanned triple turn. In September, Chiles was selected as the non-traveling alternate for the World Championships.

2018
On March 18, Chiles made her senior international debut at the Stuttgart World Cup where she placed third behind Jin Zhang of China and Elisabeth Seitz of Germany, posting the highest scores of the competition on vault and floor. On April 8, Chiles was named to the team to compete at the Pacific Rim Championships. There she won team gold as well as gold on vault and floor exercise and bronze on the balance beam.

In August, Chiles competed at the National Championships where she placed eleventh in the all-around and second on vault behind Simone Biles. She also placed tenth on uneven bars, fourteenth on balance beam, and twenty-first on floor exercise. She was not named to the senior national team. She received media recognition for competing in a Wonder Woman inspired leotard. In October, Chiles participated in the Worlds Team Selection Camp. During the competition, she placed third on vault behind Biles and Shilese Jones, seventh in the all-around and on balance beam, and sixth on uneven bars and floor exercise. While she did not make the world team, she was added to the 2018-2019 national team.

In November, Chiles signed her National Letter of Intent with UCLA, deferring until after the 2020 Olympics and initially planning to start in the 2020–2021 school year.

2019–20
In June, it was revealed that Chiles had switched gyms, leaving Naydenov Gymnastics in her hometown of Vancouver, Washington and moving to Spring, Texas to train at World Champions Centre, the same gym at which Simone Biles trains.

Chiles was expected to compete at the American Classic. However, days before the competition, she withdrew. At the 2019 U.S. Classic in July, Chiles finished eleventh in the all-around with a score of 54.650. She also tied for eighth on the uneven bars with Leanne Wong, placed twelfth on the balance beam, and tied for sixteenth on the floor exercise with Sloane Blakely. At the 2019 U.S. National Championships in August, Chiles performed all eight of her routines without a fall to place sixth in the all-around. She also finished seventh on uneven bars, tied with Riley McCusker, placed twelfth on balance beam, and seventh on floor exercise. As a result, she was named to the national team.

In September, Chiles competed at the 2019 World team selection camp and placed eleventh with a score of 53.400 after falling on her Amanar vault and on floor exercise, and she was not named to the World Championships team. Chiles did not compete at all during the 2020 season due to the COVID-19 pandemic in the United States.

2021 
In February, Chiles became the first ever women's all-around Winter Cup champion. She also finished first on vault and floor exercise, second on balance beam, and fourth on uneven bars. In May, Chiles placed second in the all-around at the U.S. Classic behind teammate Simone Biles. She also finished second on uneven bars, fourth on balance beam, and second on floor exercise. In June, Chiles placed third in the all-around at the U.S. National Gymnastics Championships behind Simone Biles and Sunisa Lee. She also finished third on vault. As a result she was named to the national team and selected to compete at the Olympic Trials.

At the Olympic Trials, Chiles finished third, once again behind Biles and Lee, and was named to the Olympic team alongside Biles, Lee, and Grace McCallum.  Chiles was the only US team member to hit every routine she competed during the season leading up to the Olympics; out of 24 total routines, she did not fall once.

At the Olympic Games Chiles performed the all-around during qualifications. She finished 40th after struggles on multiple events: on uneven bars she brushed her feet on the ground during a transition between the bars, incurring a deduction equivalent to that of a fall; on balance beam she fell on her acrobatic series and put her hands down on her dismount. Her performance helped qualify the USA team to the team final in second place behind the Russian Olympic Committee.

During the team final Chiles was initially set to compete only on vault and floor exercise. However, Simone Biles withdrew from the competition after the first rotation and Chiles replaced her on uneven bars and balance beam.  She hit both of those routines despite not having warmed up on either, but fell on her third pass on floor exercise. The United States won the silver medal, finishing second behind the Russian Olympic Committee.

2022 
In August Chiles competed at the National Championships.  She finished third in the all-around behind Konnor McClain and Shilese Jones.  In September Chiles competed at the Paris World Challenge Cup; she only competed on vault, uneven bars, and floor exercise.  She qualified to all three event finals.  During event finals she won gold on floor exercise, silver on vault behind teammate Jade Carey, and placed fifth on uneven bars.

In October Chiles was selected to compete at the 2022 World Championships alongside Skye Blakely, Jade Carey, Shilese Jones, and Leanne Wong.  During the qualification round Chiles helped the USA qualify to the team final in first place.  Individually she qualified to the vault and floor exercise finals.  Although she recorded the twelfth highest all-around score, she did not advance to the final due to teammates Jones and Carey scoring higher.  During the team final Chiles contributed scores on all four apparatuses, helping the USA win their sixth consecutive team gold medal.  On the first day of apparatus finals Chiles won silver on vault behind compatriot Carey.  On the final day of competition she won silver on floor exercise behind Jessica Gadirova.

NCAA career

2021–22 season
During the fall of 2021 Chiles joined Simone Biles' Gold Over America Tour alongside Bruin alum Katelyn Ohashi.  She joined the Bruins gymnastics team in December.  Chiles made her NCAA debut on January 17, 2022 in a meet against Iowa and Minnesota.  She only competed on the uneven bars and vault.  On February 4, in a meet against Utah, Chiles earned her first collegiate perfect ten on floor exercise.  She also won the all-around with a score of 39.700.  As a result Chiles was named Pac-12 freshman of the week.

Career perfect 10.0

Regular season ranking

Competitive history

References

External links 
 
 
 

2001 births
African-American female gymnasts
American female artistic gymnasts
Living people
People from Tualatin, Oregon
Sportspeople from Vancouver, Washington
U.S. women's national team gymnasts
Gymnasts at the 2020 Summer Olympics
Olympic gymnasts of the United States
Olympic silver medalists for the United States in gymnastics
Medalists at the World Artistic Gymnastics Championships
Medalists at the 2020 Summer Olympics
NCAA gymnasts who have scored a perfect 10
21st-century African-American sportspeople
21st-century African-American women
UCLA Bruins women's gymnasts